Arlington Reservoir is a  biological Site of Special Scientific Interest west of Hailsham in East Sussex. It is also a Local Nature Reserve and it is owned and managed by South East Water.

Wildlife
The site is of ornithological interest, with over 1% of the total UK wintering wigeon being populated within the site. Alder Alnus glutinosa and willow Salix species are part of the open water. The site is also home to a scrub of hawthorn (Crataegus monogyna). A large jetty juts into the water a few hundred yards away from  a water treatment building. The reservoir was originally created by damming the River Cuckmere, which previously meandered to the middle of the present-day reservoir. The Cuckmere is now channelled in a straight line just to the east.

Located on the northwest bank of the reservoir is the Osprey Birdhide. It is a popular place to view the population of cormorants which regularly visit to rest on the banks and trees surrounding the water. Other species include great crested grebe, swallow, mallard, pied wagtail, coot, Canada goose, rook, and sheep graze in the surrounding water meadows. Black swans, presumably escapees from captivity can often be seen on the water.

References

External links
Reservoir level from South East Water
Natural England Arlington Reservoir citation

Sites of Special Scientific Interest in East Sussex
Sites of Special Scientific Interest notified in 1985
Drinking water reservoirs in England
Local Nature Reserves in East Sussex
Reservoirs in East Sussex